Tripartite motif-containing protein 21, also known as E3 ubiquitin-protein ligase TRIM21, is a protein that in humans is encoded by the TRIM21 gene. Alternatively spliced transcript variants for this gene have been described but the full-length nature of only one has been determined. It is expressed in most human tissues.

Structure
TRIM21 is a member of the tripartite motif (TRIM) family. The TRIM motif includes three zinc-binding domains, a RING finger domain, a B-box type 1 and a B-box type 2 zinc finger, and a coiled coil region.

Function
TRIM21 is an intracellular antibody effector in the intracellular antibody-mediated proteolysis pathway. It recognizes Fc domain and binds to immunoglobulin G, immunoglobulin A and immunoglobulin M on antibody marked non-enveloped virions which have infected the cell. Either by autoubiquitination or by ubiquitination of a cofactor, it is then responsible for directing the virions to the proteasome. TRIM21 itself is not degraded in the proteasome unlike both the viral capsid and the bound antibody.

TRIM21 is part of the RoSSA ribonucleoprotein, which includes a single polypeptide and one of four small RNA molecules. The RoSSA particle localizes to both the cytoplasm and the nucleus.

Clinical significance
RoSSA interacts with autoantigens in patients with Sjögren's syndrome and systemic lupus erythematosus. In addition, the inability for lupus-prone macrophages to degrade immune complexes in the lysosome results in the leakage of autoantibodies into the cytosol that can bind to TRIM21 and enhance NF-κB signaling.

TRIM21 can be used to knockout specific proteins with their corresponding antibodies, a method known as Trim-Away. In this assay, TRIM21 and  antibodies are delivered into cells through electroporation, and the targeted protein is degraded within a few minutes.

References

Further reading